The Pardinho River is a river located in the state of Rio Grande do Sul, Brazil, having a length of 107 km.

Rivers of Rio Grande do Sul